Mansurabad or Mansoor Abad may refer to:

Iran

Bushehr Province
Mansurabad, Bushehr, a village in Dashtestan County

East Azerbaijan Province
Mansurabad, East Azerbaijan, a village in Bostanabad County

Fars Province
Mansurabad, Fars, a village in Darab County
Mansurabad, Rostaq, a village in Darab County
Mansurabad, Farashband, a village in Farashband County
Mansurabad, Kazerun, a village in Kazerun County
Mansurabad, Larestan, a village in Larestan County
Mansurabad, Marvdasht, a village in Marvdasht County
Mansurabad, Kamfiruz, a village in Marvdasht County
Mansurabad, Rudbal, a village in Marvdasht County
Mansurabad, Seyyedan, a village in Marvdasht County
Mansurabad, Pasargad, a village in Pasargad County
Mansurabad-e Olya, a village in Rostam County
Mansurabad-e Sofla, a village in Rostam County
Mansurabad, Shiraz, a village in Shiraz County

Hamadan Province
Mansurabad, Hamadan, a village in Razan County

Ilam Province
Mansurabad, former name of Mehran, Ilam, Iran

Isfahan Province
Mansurabad, Isfahan, a village in Shahreza County

Kerman Province
Mansurabad, Baft, a village in Baft County
Mansurabad, Rafsanjan, a village in Rafsanjan County
Mansurabad, Zeydabad, a village in Sirjan County

Kermanshah Province
Mansurabad, Kermanshah, a village in Eslamabad-e Gharb County
Mansurabad, alternate name of Amirabad, Eslamabad-e Gharb, a village in Eslamabad-e Gharb County
Mansurabad, Ravansar, a village in Ravansar County

Khuzestan Province
Mansurabad, Behbahan, a village in Behbahan County

Kohgiluyeh and Boyer-Ahmad Province
Mansurabad-e Mehdiyeh, a village in Basht County
Mansurabad, Sarrud-e Jonubi, a village in Boyer-Ahmad County
Mansurabad-e Sarab Khamzan, a village in Boyer-Ahmad County

Mazandaran Province
Mansurabad, Mazandaran, a village in Tonekabon County

North Khorasan Province
Mansurabad, North Khorasan, a village in North Khorasan Province, Iran

Qom Province
Mansurabad, Qom, a village in Qom Province, Iran

Sistan and Baluchestan Province
Mansurabad, Chabahar,a  village in Chabahar County
Mansurabad, Khash, a village in Khash County

South Khorasan Province
Mansurabad, Darmian, a village in Darmian County
Mansurabad, Nehbandan, a village in Nehbandan County

West Azerbaijan Province
Mansurabad, Miandoab, a village in Miandoab County
Mansurabad, Urmia, a village in Urmia County

Yazd Province
Mansurabad, Taft, a village in Taft  County
Mansurabad, Yazd, a village in Yazd County

Pakistan
Mansoorabad, Punjab, Pakistan